Schutzengel may refer to:

 Schutzengel (film), a 2012 film
 Schutzengel (EP), an EP by Unheilig